Ulrichswasser is a river of Lower Saxony, Germany. It is a right tributary of the Warme Bode in the town of Braunlage in the district of Goslar.

Course 
The source region of the Ulrichswasser lies roughly northeast of Königskrug in the Königsbruch marsh at the foot of the Achtermannshöhe ridge at a height of about 760 metres. The stream then descends a height of 180 metres over a distance of  before discharging into the Warme Bode at a height of about 580 m above sea level.

The stream is not named after the forester  (1838–1927) as might be supposed. It is described as the Ulmersches Wasser already on a forest map from the 18th century.

See also
List of rivers of Lower Saxony

Rivers of Lower Saxony
Rivers of the Harz
Rivers of Germany